State Route 184 was a state highway in the U.S. state of Utah. It was a  loop that connected U.S. Route 89 (US-89) in Salt Lake City with the Utah State Capitol. The route was originally added to the state highway system in 1935 as part of SR-181, and SR-184 was created in 1963 as a split from that route. It would remain until 2007, when it was deleted in a series of highway realignments in the Salt Lake City area. However, its route remains on the state highway system as SR-186.

Route description

SR-184 began in Downtown Salt Lake City at the intersection of State Street, North Temple, and 2nd Avenue. At the time, US-89 went west and south from this intersection, though it has since been rerouted. SR-184 left downtown on State Street, climbing Capitol Hill and entering the neighborhood of the same name before turning west at 300 North, just south of the Utah State Capitol. SR-184 continued to follow the south and west side of the capitol grounds, turning northeast on Columbus Street. After passing the capitol, the route turned northwest onto Victory Road and followed it down to its northern terminus at US-89 (Beck Street).

History
The route from North Temple and State Street northwest to Beck Street by way of the Utah State Capitol was added to the state highway system in 1935 as State Route 181, which also extended to include much of South Temple and 1300 East. In 1963 the portion of SR-181 north of North Temple was split off as SR-184 to avoid a one-block concurrency with US-89A/US-91A along State Street.

In 2007, several highways in the Salt Lake City area were realigned to accommodate the construction of the Utah Transit Authority's TRAX Green Line along North Temple, which was SR-186. As a result, North Temple was removed from the state highway system. SR-186 was truncated back to State Street and extended north along what had formerly been US-89 and SR-184. US-89 was realigned to absorb the old alignment of SR-186 not on North Temple, while SR-184 was completely decommissioned.

Major intersections

References

184
 184 (1963-2007)
 184 (1963-2007)